Aluminium monoacetate, also known as dibasic aluminium acetate, and formally named dihydroxy aluminium acetate, is a salt of aluminium with acetic acid. It has the formula Al(OH)2(CH3COO), with aluminium in an oxidation state of +3, and appears under standard conditions as a white solid powder.

Chemistry 

Aluminium monoacetate is prepared from the reaction between Al(OH)3 and dilute aqueous acetic acid. It is also formed from the successive hydrolysis of aluminium triacetate.

Al(CH3COO)3 + H2O → Al(OH)(CH3COO)2 + CH3COOH
Al(OH)(CH3COO)2 + H2O → Al(OH)2(CH3COO) + CH3COOH

Uses 
Aluminium monoacetate is a dermatological agent used as an antiseptic and astringent. It is used as an antiseptic to reduce the possibility of infection in minor wounds, cuts, and burns. Specifically, it treats itching, stinging of the infected skin, inflammation, and it promotes healing. It also can be used as a topical astringent to help shrink the body's tissues when applied to the skin as it acts as a protective layer on irritated and inflamed skin.

References

Aluminium compounds
Acetates
Hydroxides